The Temperance Fête is a 1932 British comedy film directed by Graham Cutts and starring George Robey, Sydney Fairbrother, and Connie Ediss. The screenplay concerns a waiter at a temperance meeting who spikes the lemonade with alcohol.

Premise
For a prank one of the waiters at a temperance meeting spikes the lemonade with alcohol.

Cast
George Robey as Bindle
Sydney Fairbrother as Mrs. Bindle
Connie Ediss as Mrs. Hearty
Gibb McLaughlin as Mr. Hearty
Seth Egbert as Ginger
Anita Sharp-Bolster as Teacher

References

External links

1932 films
1932 comedy films
British comedy films
Films directed by Graham Cutts
British black-and-white films
1930s British films